Uelkal (Yupik: Валъӄалыӄ, lit. Whale Jaw; Chukchi: , Valḳalḷʼan) is a village (selo) in Iultinsky District of Chukotka Autonomous Okrug, Russia. Population:  a slight reduction on a 2003 estimate of 258, of whom 208 were indigenous people, which itself showed a slight increase, up from 202 the previous year. Municipally, Uelkal is subordinated to Iultinsky Administrative District and incorporated as Uelkal Rural Settlement.

Geography
Uelkal is situated on the south side of Cape Annyualkal spit at the entrance to Kresta Bay, by the Bering Sea, 174 km from the District centre Egvekinot. The village is the most western settlement in Russia in the western hemisphere and the most western Eskimo settlements in the world.

History
The village was founded in 1920 by settlers from Cape Chaplino. During World War II, this was the eastern stage on the ALSIB Uelkal-Krasnoyarsk route for US-made lend-lease warplanes to Russia.  During the mid-1950s, the Central Intelligence Agency suspected that a major bomber staging base was being built at Uelkal capable of reaching United States, however the Soviets instead built the facility at Anadyr Ugolny Airport  to the south and the Uelkal airfield fell into decline. Until the early 2000s near the village acted as tropospheric intermediate relay station number 20/103, part of the "North" link (call sign – "Kazan"). As of 2002, it had 258 inhabitants, of whom 202 were indigenous people, though this has reduced significantly in the last decade, with 2014 estimates indicating a population of only 210.

Economy
The village has a secondary school, a medical assistant-midwife centre, a pharmacy, a communications centre, and a store. The main sources of livelihood for the residents of this town are hunting seals, walrus, and whales, which is done as part of the municipal agricultural enterprise "Nanuk". In the village there is a high school, a kindergarten, a local hospital, pharmacy, home culture, communication center and shop as well as a rural folk club, the Chukchi-Eskimo group "Imlya", youth groups "Kiyagnyk" (lit. "Life") and "Avsinahak" (lit. "pups").

Transport
Uelkal is not connected to any other part of the world by road however, there is a small network of roads within the village including:

улица Вальгиргина (Ulitsa Val′girgina)
улица Набережная (Ulitsa Naberezhnaya, lit. Quay Street)
улица Тундровая (Ulitsa Tundrovnaya, lit. Tundra Street)
улица Центральная (Ulitsa Tsentralnaya, lit. Central Street)

Climate
Uelkal has a Continental Subarctic or Boreal (taiga) climate (Dfc).

See also
List of inhabited localities in Iultinsky District

References

Notes

Sources
 
 

M Strogoff, P-C Brochet, and D. Auzias Petit Futé: Chukotka (2006). "Avant-Garde" Publishing House.

External links
Uelkal photo gallery 

Rural localities in Chukotka Autonomous Okrug